

Plants

Cycads

Conifers

Angiosperms

Arthropods

Insects

Archosauromorphs
 During the 1992 field season a concerted effort was undertaken by the Royal Tyrell Museum to recover the remains of young hadrosaurs. The researchers describe the acquisition that season of 43 specimens as being a success. Most of the recovered fossils were of dentaries missing their teeth, bones from limbs and feet, as well as vertebral centra.
 Jack Horner speculated that transitional species evolved in the uppermost part of the Two Medicine Formation during the Bearpaw Transgression. This was during a half-million year span as the transgression inundated the Judith River Formation and, later, the Two Medicine area, gradually destroying the local dinosaurs' preferred habitats. Horner cited certain ceratopsid and pachycephalosaurid species as possible evidence for his hypothesis.

Newly named non-avian dinosaurs 
Data courtesy of George Olshevsky's dinosaur genera list.

Newly named birds

Footnotes

References
 Tanke, D.H. and Brett-Surman, M.K. 2001. Evidence of Hatchling and Nestling-Size Hadrosaurs (Reptilia:Ornithischia) from Dinosaur Provincial Park (Dinosaur Park Formation: Campanian), Alberta, Canada. pp. 206–218. In: Mesozoic Vertebrate Life—New Research Inspired by the Paleontology of Philip J. Currie. Edited by D.H. Tanke and K. Carpenter. Indiana University Press: Bloomington. xviii + 577 pp.
 Trexler, D., 2001, Two Medicine Formation, Montana: geology and fauna: In:  Mesozoic Vertebrate Life, edited by Tanke, D. H., and Carpenter, K., Indiana  University Press, pp. 298–309.

 
1990s in paleontology
Paleontology